Edward Williams (born November 24, 1982) is a former American football wide receiver. He was signed by the Tennessee Titans as an undrafted free agent in 2008. He played college football at Lane.

Williams has been a member of the Baltimore Ravens and Cleveland Browns.

External links
Cleveland Browns bio

1982 births
Living people
Players of American football from Montgomery, Alabama
American football wide receivers
Lane Dragons football players
Tennessee Titans players
Baltimore Ravens players
Cleveland Browns players